Continental Europe or mainland Europe is the contiguous continent of Europe, excluding its surrounding islands. It can also be referred to ambiguously as the European continent, – which can conversely mean the whole of Europe – and, by some, simply as the Continent. When Eurasia is regarded as a single continent, Europe is treated as a subcontinent, and called as European subcontinent.

The old notion of Europe as a cultural term was centred on core Europe (Kerneuropa), the continental territory of the historical Carolingian Empire, corresponding to modern France, Italy, German-speaking Europe and the Benelux states (historical Austrasia). This historical core of "Carolingian Europe" was consciously invoked in the 1950s as the historical ethno-cultural basis for the prospective European integration (see also Multi-speed Europe).

Usage
The most common definition of mainland Europe excludes these continental islands: the Greek islands, Cyprus, Malta, Sicily, Sardinia, Corsica, the Balearic Islands, Great Britain and Ireland and surrounding islands, Novaya Zemlya and the Nordic archipelago, as well as nearby oceanic islands, including the Canary Islands, Madeira, the Azores, Iceland, the Faroe Islands, and Svalbard.

The Scandinavian Peninsula is sometimes also excluded as, even though it is a part of "mainland Europe", the de facto connections to the rest of the continent are across the Baltic Sea or North Sea (rather than via the lengthy land route that involves travelling to the north of the peninsula where it meets Finland, and then south through northeast Europe).

Great Britain and Ireland
In both Great Britain and Ireland, the Continent is widely and generally used to refer to the mainland of Europe. An amusing British newspaper headline supposedly once read, "Fog in Channel; Continent Cut Off". It has also been claimed that this was a regular weather forecast in Britain in the 1930s. In addition, the word Europe itself is also regularly used to mean Europe excluding the islands of Great Britain, Iceland, and Ireland (although the term is often used to refer to the European Union). The term mainland Europe is also sometimes used. Usage of these terms may reflect political or cultural allegiances, for example it has been observed that there is a correlation between whether a British citizen considers themselves "British" or "European" and whether they live in an area which primarily supported Brexit.

Derivatively, the adjective continental refers to the social practices or fashion of continental Europe. Examples include breakfast, topless sunbathing and, historically, long-range driving (before Britain had motorways) often known as Grand Touring. Differences include electrical plugs, time zones for the most part, the use of left-hand traffic, and for the United Kingdom, currency and the continued use of certain imperial units alongside the metric units which have long since displaced customary units in Continental Europe.

Britain is physically connected to continental Europe through the undersea Channel Tunnel (the longest undersea tunnel in the world), which accommodates both the Eurotunnel Shuttle (passenger and vehicle use – vehicle required) and Eurostar (passenger use only) services. These services were established to transport passengers and vehicles through the tunnel on a 24/7 basis between England and continental Europe, while still maintaining passport and immigration control measures on both sides of the tunnel. This route is popular with refugees and migrants seeking to enter the UK.

Scandinavia

Especially in Germanic studies, continental refers to the European continent excluding the Scandinavian peninsula, Britain, Ireland, and Iceland. The reason for this is that although the Scandinavian peninsula is attached to continental Europe, and accessible via a land route along the 66th parallel north, it is usually reached by sea.

 ("the Continent") is a vernacular Swedish expression that refers to an area excluding Sweden, Norway, and Finland but including Denmark (even the Danish archipelago which is technically not a part of continental Europe) and the rest of continental Europe. In Denmark, Jutland is referred to as the mainland and thereby a part of continental Europe.

The Scandinavian peninsula is now connected to the Danish mainland (the Jutland peninsula) by several bridges and tunnels.

Mediterranean and Atlantic islands
The Continent may sometimes refer to the continental part of France (excluding Corsica and overseas France), the continental part of Greece (excluding the Aegean Islands, Crete, and the Ionian Islands), the continental part of Italy (excluding Sardinia, Sicily, etc.), the continental part of Portugal (excluding the Azores and Madeira), or the continental part of Spain (excluding the Balearic Islands, the Canary Islands, the plazas de soberanía, etc.). The term is used from the perspective of the island residents of each country to describe the continental portion of their country or the continent (or mainland) as a whole.

Continental France is also known as l'Hexagone, "the Hexagon", referring to its approximate shape on a map. Continental Spain is referred to as peninsular Spain.

See also
 Contiguous United States
 Continental philosophy
 Geographical midpoint of Europe
 Hajnal line
 Mainland
 Mainland Australia
 Mainland China
 Regions of Europe

References

Regions of Europe
Political geography